Aleksander Zasławski (died 1629) was a Polish-Lithuanian noble, voivode of Bracław (died 1628) and voivode of Kiev (1628–1629).

In 1620 he inherited much wealth from his relative, Janusz Ostrogski.

Son of Janusz Zasławski and Aleksandra Sanguszko. Married to Eufrozyna Ostrogska. Father of Władysław Dominik Zasławski, Franciszek Zasławski and Karol Zasławski.

Secular senators of the Polish–Lithuanian Commonwealth
1629 deaths
17th-century Polish nobility
Aleksander
Year of birth unknown